Camponotus sesquipedalis is a species of carpenter ant. It is found in Sri Lanka.

References

External links

 at antwiki.org
Itis.gov
Animaldiversity.org

sesquipedalis
Hymenoptera of Asia
Insects described in 1863